Przevalski's redstart (Phoenicurus alaschanicus), also known as the Ala Shan redstart, is a species of bird in the family Muscicapidae.
It is endemic to China.

Its natural habitat is temperate forests.
It is threatened by habitat loss.

References

Przevalski's redstart
Birds of North China
Birds of Central China
Endemic birds of China
Przevalski's redstart
Taxonomy articles created by Polbot